The black snake mackerel (Nealotus tripes) is a species of snake mackerel found worldwide in both tropical and temperate waters where they are found at depths of from  making diel vertical migrations from mesopelagic depths to the surface at night.  It can reach a length of  SL though most do not exceed  SL.  It is important to local peoples as a food fish.  This species is currently the only known member of its genus, Nealotus.  That genus is therefore said to be monotypic.

Parasites
As all fish, the black snake mackerel has a variety of parasites. A study performed on fish from the subtropical upwelling region off North-West-Africa indicated that they harbour Myxozoa, Digenea, Monogenea, Cestoda, Nematoda including two species of Anisakis, Acanthocephala, and Copepoda.

References

External links
 Photograph

Gempylidae
Fish described in 1865